Morocco competed at the 2018 Winter Olympics in Pyeongchang, South Korea, from 9 to 25 February 2018, with two competitors in two sports.

Competitors
The following is the list of number of competitors participating in the Moroccan delegation per sport.

Alpine skiing 

Morocco qualified one male athlete. Adam Lamhamedi and his brother Sami, both qualified to compete at the games, however only one can compete. Just like in 2014, Sami will travel as an alternate in case of injury to Adam.

Cross-country skiing 

Morocco qualified one male athlete. Azzimani competed for the country at the 2010 Winter Olympics in alpine skiing, and switched disciplines for these games.

Distance

See also
Morocco at the 2018 Summer Youth Olympics

References

Nations at the 2018 Winter Olympics
2018
2018 in Moroccan sport